Independence High School is a public high school located in the city of Frisco, Texas (USA) and classified as a 5A school by UIL. It is a part of the Frisco Independent School District located in western Collin County. It opened in the fall of 2014 to freshmen, sophomore and junior students. The first class to graduate was the class of 2016. In 2015, the school was rated "Met Standard" by the Texas Education Agency.

Events 

Independence High School was opened to students in 2014.

Athletics
The Independence Knights compete in the following sports:

 Baseball
 Basketball
 Cross Country
 Football
 Golf
 Powerlifting
 Soccer
 Softball
 Swimming and Diving
 Tennis
 Track and Field
 Volleyball
 Wrestling
 Fishing

References

External links

 Official website

Frisco Independent School District high schools
Frisco, Texas
High schools in Collin County, Texas
Educational institutions established in 2014
2014 establishments in Texas